88 The Winners was a various artists "hits" collection album released in Australia in 1988 on the WEA record Label. The album spent 4 weeks at the top of the Australian album charts in 1988. It was released on LP with 16 tracks, and on CD and cassette with 18 tracks.

Track listing

Charts

References

1988 compilation albums
Warner Music Group compilation albums
Pop compilation albums